George Alexander Philips Haldane Haldane-Duncan (9 May 1845 − 5 December 1933) was the fourth and last Earl of Camperdown.

Duncan worked for the British firm Mawdley Sons & Field, which made engines for ships in the Royal Navy, the Italian Navy, and the White Star Line.

In 1888, Duncan married Mrs. Laura Blanchard (née Dove), an American from Boston, Massachusetts, daughter of industrialist John Dove, of Andover, Massachusetts. The couple lived in Boston for the rest of their lives, with trips to the United Kingdom every two years. Blanchard died in 1910.

In 1918, Duncan inherited the earldom when his older brother, the 3rd Earl, died. Although Duncan took the title, he declined the associated inheritance. Due to his involvement with charities in the Boston area, Duncan did not want to move back to the United Kingdom.  Instead, he arranged for the inheritance to go to younger members of his British family.

Duncan died in Boston on December 5, 1933, after a long illness.

References 

1845 births
1933 deaths
Earls in the Peerage of the United Kingdom
British people of Scottish descent